Don't Worry Ho Jayega is an Indian television comedy series that aired on Sahara TV. The series stars Ashok Saraf and is produced by his wife Nivedita Saraf. The series premiered on 4 April 2000.

Cast
Ashok Saraf as Sanjay Bhandari
Jatin Kanakia as Moti
Bharti Achrekar
Sheela Sharma
Vijay Patkar as Ramesh
Sudhir Joshi
Khota ullu

References

External links
Don't Worry Ho Jayega Official Site on YouTube

Sahara One original programming
Indian comedy television series
2000 Indian television series debuts